+
Agathotoma candidissima, common name Cox's mangelia, is a species of sea snail, a marine gastropod mollusc in the family Mangeliidae.

Description
The length of the shell varies between 4 mm and 11 mm.

The white oblong, turreted shell contains 7 or 8 whorls (the nucleus of the specimen has broken off). The axial sculpture consists of 7 to 8 ribs. The manner in which some of the ribs on the body whorl turn suddenly at right angles to the base of the columella is very remarkable. The penultimate and the three or four preceding ribs exhibit this character. At the upper ends, a little below the suture, the ribs are faintly angled ; and the dots on the base in the upper whorls and on the middle and lower part in the body whorl are so faint that they might be easily overlooked. There are also a few faint dots between the ribs, just below the suture. The aperture is elongate-ovate and covers about 3/7 of the total length of the shell. The outer lip is incrassate and on top slightly insinuate. The siphonal canal is short. The base of the shell is truncated.

Distribution
This species occurs in the Caribbean Sea, the Gulf of Mexico and the Lesser Antilles. Fossils have been found from the Early Pleistocene to the Middle Pleistocene in Southern Florida.

References

 Pfeiffer, L. 1840. Uebersicht der im Januar, Februar und März 1839 auf Cuba gesammelten Mollusken. Archiv für Naturgeschichte 6(1) 250-261
 C.B. Adams, Specierum novarum conchyliorum, in Jamaica repertorum, synopsis; Proceedings of the Boston Society of Natural History.v. 2 (1845-1848)
 Reeve, L. 1846. Monograph of the genus Mangelia. Conchologia Iconica 3 pls. 1-8
 Adams, C. B. 1850. Descriptions of supposed new species of marine shells, which inhabit Jamaica. Contributions to Conchology 4 56-68.
 Smith, E. A. 1882. Diagnoses of new species of Pleurotomidae in the British Museum. Annals and Magazine of Natural History (5)10 206-218
 Fargo, W. G. 1953. Pliocene Mollusca of Southern Florida. Part II. The Pliocene Turridae of Saint Petersburg, Florida. Monographs of the Academy of Natural Sciences of Philadelphia 18 365-409, pls. 16-24
 Rolán E., Fernández-Garcés E. & Redfern C. (2012) New records and description of four new species of the genus Agathotoma (Gastropoda, Mangeliidae) in the Caribbean. Novapex 13(2): 45-62.

External links
 Rosenberg, G., F. Moretzsohn, and E. F. García. 2009. Gastropoda (Mollusca) of the Gulf of Mexico, Pp. 579–699 in Felder, D.L. and D.K. Camp (eds.), Gulf of Mexico–Origins, Waters, and Biota. Biodiversity. Texas A&M Press, College Station, Texas
  Tucker, J.K. 2004 Catalog of recent and fossil turrids (Mollusca: Gastropoda). Zootaxa 682:1-1295.
 
 Dowgiallo, Michael Joseph. Patterns in diversity and distribution of benthic molluscs along a depth gradient in the Bahamas. Diss. 2004.
 De Jong K.M. & Coomans H.E. (1988) Marine gastropods from Curaçao, Aruba and Bonaire. Leiden: E.J. Brill. 261 pp. 

candidissima
Gastropods described in 1845